Belses railway station served the village of Belses, Scottish Borders, Scotland from 1849 to 1969 on the Waverley Route.

History 
The station opened on 1 November 1849 as New Belses by the North British Railway. The station was situated on the south side of the B6400. The name was changed to Belses in July 1862, although the name was still shown as New Belses in the timetable until 1868. The goods yard was on the up side and was accessed from two points of the station. The yard consisted of a cattle dock with a loop siding passing to the east. Beyond the siding was a building that may have been a coal depot. On 28 December 1964 goods services were withdrawn from the station and the sidings in the goods yard were quickly lifted. In March 1967 the station was downgraded to an unstaffed halt, although the suffix 'halt' never appeared in the timetable. The station was closed to passengers on 6 January 1969.

References

External links 

Disused railway stations in the Scottish Borders
Railway stations in Great Britain opened in 1849
Railway stations in Great Britain closed in 1969
Beeching closures in Scotland
Former North British Railway stations
1849 establishments in Scotland
1969 disestablishments in Scotland